Mt. Pisgah A. M.E. Church is a historic African Methodist Episcopal church located at Hackett Avenue and James Street in Greenwood, Greenwood County, South Carolina.  It was built in 1908, and is a brick Gothic Revival-style church.  It features a steep, cross-gabled roof with stepped end gables, asymmetrical massing, and pointed stained glass windows.

It was listed on the National Register of Historic Places in 1979.

References

African-American history of South Carolina
African Methodist Episcopal churches in South Carolina
Churches on the National Register of Historic Places in South Carolina
Churches completed in 1908
Gothic Revival church buildings in South Carolina
20th-century Methodist church buildings in the United States
National Register of Historic Places in Greenwood County, South Carolina
Buildings and structures in Greenwood, South Carolina
1908 establishments in South Carolina